Kathleen Fenwick,  (17 June 1901 – 28 September 1973) was the first curator of the collection of prints and drawings of the National Gallery of Canada from 1928 until her death in 1973. She was the first female curator in Canada.

In 1968, she was made an Officer of the Order of Canada for being "largely responsible for developing the collection into one of the finest of its kind."

References

External links 
Kathleen Fenwick fonds at the National Gallery of Canada, Ottawa, Ontario.

Canadian art curators
Officers of the Order of Canada
1901 births
1973 deaths
20th-century Canadian historians
Canadian women historians
20th-century Canadian women writers
Canadian women curators
British emigrants to Canada